Gangs of Wasseypur – Part 2 is a 2012 Indian Hindi-language crime film co-written, produced and directed by Anurag Kashyap. It is the second installment of the Gangs of Wasseypur series centered on the coal mafia of Dhanbad, Jharkhand, and the underlying power struggles, politics and vengeance between three crime families. Part 2 features an ensemble cast with Nawazuddin Siddiqui, Manoj Bajpayee, Richa Chadda, Huma Qureshi, Reema Sen, Piyush Mishra, Pankaj Tripathi, Zeishan Quadri, Rajkumar Rao and Tigmanshu Dhulia in major roles. Its story spans from the 1990s to 2009.

Both parts were originally shot as a single film measuring a total of 319 minutes and screened at the 2012 Cannes Directors' Fortnight but since no Indian theatre would volunteer to screen a five plus hour movie, it was divided into two parts (160 mins and 159 mins respectively) for the Indian market.

The film received an Adults Only certification from the Indian Censor Board but is still unusually explicit for Indian standards as it contained vulgar lingo and violence generally suppressed by mainstream Indian movies. The film's soundtrack is heavily influenced by traditional Indian folk songs tending to be philosophical and liberal with its heavy use of sexual innuendos.
Part 2 was released on 8 August 2012 across India and had some paid previews on 7 August 2012.

Both parts of the film were acclaimed by the critics upon release. The combined film won the
Best Audiography, Re-recordist's of the Final Mixed Track
(Alok De, Sinoy Joseph and Shreejesh Nair) and Special Mention for acting (Nawazuddin Siddiqui) at the 60th National Film Awards. The film won four Filmfare Awards, including Best Film (Critics) and Best Actress (Critics), at the 58th Filmfare Awards. The individual film was declared flop at box-office. Although not a huge hit by any financial standard, the meagre combined budget of ₹18.5 crore allowed the 2 films to be cumulatively commercially successful, with net domestic earnings of ₹50.81 crore (of the 2 parts combined). It is regarded by many as a modern cult film.

Plot

The film resumes with the murder of Sardar Khan (Manoj Bajpayee) by Sultan Qureshi (Pankaj Tripathi) and three of his men. When Danish (Vineet Kumar Singh), Faizal (Nawazuddin Siddiqui), and Asgar (Jameel Khan) go to retrieve his body, Danish instantly kills the lone captured killer and vows to kill the other three. Danish and Asgar explain to Faizal that his friend Fazlu had doped Faizal with marijuana the night before Sardar's death and had informed Sultan that Sardar would be travelling without bodyguards the next day. Faizal finds the whereabouts of Saggir, another of Sardar's killers from Fazlu; Danish and Asgar kill Saggir the next day. Afterwards, Danish surrenders himself to the police for stealing wood from trains and is released by paying a fine. Sultan and Fazlu gun him down at his court appearance. At Danish's funeral, Nagma (Richa Chadda) doubts Faizal's ability to exact revenge, but Faizal promises her that he will.

When Fazlu wins a local election Faizal meets him on the pretext of congratulating him, but instead beheads him. By doing so, Faizal makes his mark and becomes so feared that illegal iron traders become his cronies. Faizal then makes a truce with Ramadhir Singh (Tigmanshu Dhulia). According to their agreement, Ramadhir would provide political support to Faizal's business in Wasseypur on the condition that Faizal would not avenge his father, brother and grandfather. As Faizal's business grows, he marries his sweetheart Mohsina Hamid (Huma Qureshi). Faizal's gang then determines the whereabouts of Sardar's third killer, Khalid, through an aide. Faizal has Khalid's head shaved and then shoots him, enraging Sultan.

Babu "Perpendicular" Khan (Aditya Kumar) (Sardar's youngest son) and Definite Khan (Zieshan Quadri) (Sardar's son with Durga) are then introduced. Perpendicular, nicknamed so because of how he slashes people's necks with a razor blade, is a 14-year-old who manages to get away with looting shops with his friend Tangent (Gaurav Sharma) because no one is willing to testify against him in fear of Faizal, while Definite is a rising star in the crime world of Wasseypur.

In 2003, a small-time goon named Shamshad Alam (Rajkummar Rao) has his own transport business and then moves to trading iron, in doing so making an alliance with Faizal. Shamshad offers to increase Faizal's profits with his astute knowledge of the scrap iron business. However, Shamshad begins to keep increasingly significant portions of the profit for himself. When this is revealed to Faizal, Shamshad goes to the police and provides phone calls as evidence of Faizal's involvement in the illegal iron trade. Meanwhile, local shopkeepers lose their patience with Perpendicular's antics and hire Sultan to kill him. Ramadhir is losing faith in his son J.P.'s (Satya Anand) ability to run his empire and J.P. often finds himself in line of fire for his inability. This results in the waning of J.P.'s prominence and influence.

In December 2003, Sultan's men chase Perpendicular and Tangent from a movie theatre after they watch Munna Bhai M.B.B.S. Tangent manages to get back to Faizal's house but Sultan catches Perpendicular and kills him by some railway tracks. Faizal and his gang arrive at the scene and as they are removing Perpendicular's body, the police turn up and arrest Faizal. With Faizal in jail, Definite decides to kill Shamshad before Shamshad tries to fill Faizal's vacant position. However, Definite's pistol jams in the middle of the assassination attempt and he is forced to run. Definite eludes Shamshad but jumps onto a train car full of Army soldiers. He is arrested and jailed; there he meets Faizal.

Ramadhir advises Shamshad to bail Definite out of the jail and then instigate him against his own brother for his empire. Durga worked as a cook for Ramadhir after Sardar's death, and thus Ramadhir feels that he has the influence to put Definite up against Faizal. Faizal is aware of Shamshad's plan and cautions Definite before he leaves the jail. Definite visits Shamshad's office and throws in a grenade, causing Shamshad to lose his leg. Sultan, who was outside Shamshad's office, chases Definite and goes to Faizal's house looking for him. There Sultan doesn't find Definite but finds his sister Shama (Anurita Jha) instead. Although Shama is happy to see him, Sultan, angry at her for marrying Danish, shoots her and leaves her for dead. She survives but falls into a coma.

In January 2004, when Faizal is about to be released from jail, J.P. cautions Sultan and advises him to kill Faizal in a pre-emptive strike. Sultan launches a massive fire strike on Faizal's house (the opening scene of Part 1), but Faizal and his entire family have a lucky escape. As Sultan's gang is leaving, they find a police checkpoint waiting for them and realise that they were double crossed by J.P. Sultan escapes in the ensuing firefight. A few days later, Sultan's men kill Nagma and Asgar in a market in broad daylight. Definite and some other members of Faizal's gang track Sultan to Bhagalpur and kill him. Upon realising that Definite has avenged Danish, Shama, Nagma and Asgar, Faizal tells him to surrender to cement his reputation. With Definite in jail, Ramadhir then aims to create a rift between Definite and Faizal.

In 2005, Iqlakh (Sankalp Acharekar), an educated English-speaker, enters Faizal's gang. Iqlakh actually wants to exact revenge and is Ramadhir's mole. Iqlakh is the son of Mohsin, who was on the receiving end of Sardar's justice (the Sabrina Khan story from Part 1). Faizal is initially impressed with Iqlakh's skills and is later made aware of Iqlakh's background, but decides to ignore it. Iqlakh has an astute knowledge of business and bags scrap auctions by force. This brings in a lot of profit for Faizal without any risk, and causes him to neglect Definite. Iqlakh advises Faizal to enter politics in order to provide political protection to all his activities. Faizal decides to contest from Ramadhir's constituency to exact his own revenge.

Ramadhir, feeling threatened, has Definite released from jail and sends J.P. to negotiate a deal with him. J.P., however, is tired of his father's insults and wants to use Faizal to kill him. Ramadhir's plan is that Iqlakh will kill Faizal on election day and if he is unable, Definite will take the shot. Definite goes straight to Faizal and informs him of the plan. On election day, Definite's gang disrupts the elections by force in an effort to prevent Faizal from winning. Iqlakh leads Faizal to an isolated place and tries to kill them, but Definite arrives, double crosses Iqlakh and kills him. Definite explains to Faizal that Ramadhir changed the plan.

Faizal decides to attack Ramadhir. Mohsina tells him she's pregnant and begs him not to go but he does not listen. Faizal, Definite and other gang members take an ambulance with a large cache of weapons and head towards the hospital where Ramadhir is meeting Shamshad. They enter the hospital, and Faizal kills Shamshad, Ramadhir, and Ramadhir's men. In the ensuing firefight with the police, Faizal and Definite are the only survivors, and are arrested. En route to prison the police halt at a roadside restaurant for refreshments, leaving Faizal alone in the police van. Faizal is then shot dead by Definite, released by the police. It is revealed that J.P. was the architect of the massacre and Definite is seen free, walking towards his mother.

Four years later, in 2009, Mohsina and Nasir have moved to Mumbai with Faizal's young son, Feroz. Definite now rules Wasseypur. Nasir describes that Wasseypur was not affected by Ramadhir's and Faizal's deaths and concludes that it is still a battlefield like before.

Cast
 Nawazuddin Siddiqui as Faizal Khan                                                                                                                                                                                                                                             
 Manoj Bajpayee as Sardar Khan(cameo appearance)      
 Richa Chadda as Nagma Khatoon: Sardar's first widow; Danish, Faizal and Perpendicular's mother; Shama and Mohsina's mother in law; Feroz's grandmother.
 Huma Qureshi as Mohsina Hamid: Faizal's wife; Feroz's mother; Sardar and Nagma's daughter in law; Danish, Perpendicular, Shama's sister in law
 Reema Sen as Durga' Bangalan' Khan: Sardar's second widow; Definite's mother; Danish, Faizal, Perpendicular's stepmother.
 Sanjay Singh as Fazlu (Faizal khan's friend)
 Anurita Jha as Shama Parveen: Sultan's cousin; Danish's wife; Sardar and Nagma's daughter in law.
 Piyush Mishra as Nasir Ahmed
 Jameel Khan as Asgar Khan
 Vineet Kumar Singh as Danish Khan
 Pankaj Tripathi as Sultan Qureshi
 Satyakam Anand as J P Singh
 Murari Kumar as Guddu
 Gaurav Sharma as Iqlakh
 Faisal Malik as Inspector Gopal Singh
 Sankalp Acharekar as Tangent
 Rajkumar Rao as Shamshad Alam
 Mukesh Chhabra as Nawab (Shamshad's Partner)
 Sanjay Singh as Fazlu
 Zeishan Quadri as Definite Khan: Sardar and Durga's son; Danish, Faizal and Perpendicular's stepbrother
 Aditya Kumar as Babua "Perpendicular" Khan
 Tigmanshu Dhulia as Ramadhir Singh
 Yashpal Sharma as Occasional Singer (Guest Appearance)
 Ishtiyaq Anas (Akram Ishtiyaq) as Munna Sultan gang member
 Pramod Pathak as Badoor Qureshi

Production

Development
Anurag Kashyap had wanted to make a film set in Bihar with the name 'Bihar' for some time, but the project didn't take off. In 2008, he met Zeishan Quadri, writer of GANGS who told him about Wasseypur's story. The lawlessness of Dhanbhad and Wasseypur captured his imagination. Zeishan narrated a wide panoply of stories but what really attracted him was not the gang war itself, but the bigger story of the emergence of the mafia. According to Kashyap, telling the story through the eyes of a few families is what interested him but that also meant a longer reel. "We all know mafia exists but what they do, how they operate, why they do we don't know and that is something which forms the basis of the film". Anurag Kashyap celebrated the success of Gangs of Wasseypur – Part 2, by throwing an iftaar party at a suburban hotel at Bandra in Mumbai on Friday, 17 August, late evening.

Filming
While filming in Varanasi on 23 December 2010, the film's chief assistant director Sohil Shah was killed on a shoot while performing a stunt scene. The Movie has been dedicated to Sohil Shah. Initial parts of the movie were shot in Madhankhorchi, Kerala.
The film finished production in late March 2011, with Anurag Kashyap moving on to direct his next film immediately due to the accident. Major portions of the film were shot in villages near Bihar. Shooting of film also took place in Chunar. Anurag Kashyap, who co-produced the film with Sunil Bohra, has said that it is his most expensive film and he reportedly had to spend  150 million on paying the actors. Both parts of Gangs of Wasseypur together cost just  184 million to make, which makes one film at  92 million. Anurag Kashyap, the director of film has declared on Twitter: "45 crores as reported in the media is false."  260 million was spent on marketing the film.

Soundtrack

The soundtrack album of the two-part compilation of Gangs of Wasseypur has a whooping 27 songs, which are composed by Sneha Khanwalkar and Piyush Mishra, with lyrics by Mishra and Varun Grover. However, the album was split up according to the film's release. The film score is composed by G. V. Prakash Kumar. Part-2 has 13 songs which were released on 9 July 2012. The film's soundtrack is heavily influenced by traditional Indian folk songs. The track "Chhi Chha Ledar" was sung by 16-year-old Durga. Another track "Keh Ke Loonga" was reused from the first part.

BollywoodLife rated the soundtrack 4 out of 5 stating "The rustic touch is still very much there, but the canvas of the music is much larger and explosive." Shivi Reflections of Koimoi rated 3 out of 5 stating "Music of 'Gangs of Wasseypur – 2''' carries forward the flavor of the first part. However, while there were heady sparks like 'Hunter' and 'Womaniya' among others in the first album, a similar effect is missing in this one." Joginder Tuteja of Bollywood Hungama rated 3 out of 5 stating "Though the music isn't for an out and out massy outing, there are quite a few pieces that should aid the narrative in moving forward and create an overall cinematic appeal."

Sneha Khanwalkar had been nominated for various awards for the music of the 2 parts, including the prestigious Best Music Director award at the 58th Filmfare Awards.

Marketing

The Gangs of Wasseypur franchise promoted a fake electoral campaign through the streets of Mumbai and Delhi to market the second instalment of the political thriller. In several areas of the two cities, political posters had been plastered, in which the two opposing contestants from the movie Ramadhir Singh and Faizal Khan, vied for votes.

The main cast of Gangs of Wasseypur – Part 2  shot with the cast of Afsar Bitiya. Actors Nawazuddin Siddiqui (Faisal Khan) and Huma Qureshi (Mohsina) made a special appearance on the show. The show was aired on 7–8 August 2012.

As a part of the marketing campaign, the 'Wasseypur Patrika', a fictitious newspaper was made available online.

Reception
Critical response
IndiaGangs of Wasseypur – Part 2 received mostly positive reviews. It is rated 7/10 on the Hindi film review aggregator website ReviewGang.

Mayank Shekhar rated the movie 4/5 stars on Daily Bhaskar and his review at theW14.com reads, "This is India's equivalent of; take your pick, Sergio Leone's Once Upon A Time in America (1984), or Robert Rodriguez's Once Upon A Time in Mexico (2003), though I suppose it could possibly be better than both. It's the definitive "litti western" to borrow the stock phrase "spaghetti western" for Leone's film. With 320 minutes broken into two parts, allows Kashyap the scope to seriously self-indulge and unabashedly entertaining. The reason you prefer this sequel to the first installment, besides it being more contemporary is, well, this is where the beginning ties up with the end. You get a full sense of the film's ambitions."

Jaykumar Shah of Planet Bollywood gave the movie 8.5/10 stars, saying that "All in all, this is the best movie to come out from India this year so far. It is a gritty, well-paced, extremely well-acted, genre defining, path breaking work of art. The movie is not for the ones who are not comfortable with violence being depicted graphically. If you can digest violence on screen, it is a sure winner."

Taran Adarsh of Bollywood Hungama gave the movie 4/5 stars, saying that "On the whole, Gangs of Wasseypur – Part 2 is an Anurag Kashyap show all through and without an iota of doubt, can easily be listed as one amongst his paramount works. An engaging movie with several bravura moments. Watch it for its absolute cinematic brilliancy!"

Saibal Chatterjee of NDTV gave the movie 4/5 stars, stating that "The revenge, filmed with an operatic slo-mo rhythm, is bloodier than anything you would have seen before. But if you liked Gangs of Wasseypur, there is no reason why won’t have another blast watching Gangs of Wasseypur – Part 2. But be warned: be sure that your stomach for blood and gore doesn’t give way."

Blessy Chettiar of DNA India gave the movie 4/5 stars, commenting that "Guns speak where abusive language fails. Patience and a real kaleja will see you through this fast-paced, exhilarating blood fest. Kashyap makes sure the gore is beyond redemption. If you’re turned off by it, not his fault."

Madhureeta Mukherjee of Times of India gave the movie 4/5 stars, saying that "With excellent performances, a screenplay that's strung together beautifully (Zeishan Quadri, Akhilesh, Sachin Ladia, Anurag Kashyap) a revenge story that touches a dramatic crescendo and music that plays out perfectly in sync with tragic twists of the tale – ' GOW II' is an interesting watch, for the brave-hearted. Like the first part, the movie slows down at times (with pointless pistols, hordes of characters and wasted sub-plots); the length needs to be shot down desperately. But otherwise, it's revenge on a platter – served cold (heartedly) and definitely worth a 'second' helping."

Ananya Bhattacharya of Zee News gave the movie 4/5 stars, concluding that "While watching 'Wasseypur', the entire film takes your life away! Gangs of Wasseypur 2 is a film, which, with its predecessor, is one that is here to stay, to break conceptions, to demolish structures. With the history of Wasseypur, 'Wasseypur' has created another history."

Raja Sen of Rediff gave the movie 3.5/5 stars, stating that "Anurag Kashyap shines once again in the concluding part of Gangs of Wasseypur even though the film is a tad too long. For all its folly – and the fact that an hour could have been lopped off its running length, easy – Gangs of Wasseypur II provides enough cinematic memorabilia to single-handedly last us the summer."

Kunal Guha of Yahoo! gave the movie 3/5 stars, commenting that "While it would be nice to inherit the right amount of angst for this revenge sequel, this one intermittently recaps what led whom to get where and why. In fact, the first part wasted a lot of time in flagging historical landmarks, in introducing characters and was much scattered with the number of elements and periods to be covered. This one has characters ready to dive into action with a quick backgrounder for new additions, leaving much time to weave a tighter and telling story. Chhi Chha Leather, definitely one that weathers."

Conversely, Prathamesh Jadhav of Bollywood Life gave the movie 2.5/5 stars, saying that "In totality, Anurag Kashyap’s Gangs of Wassepur II is murkier than its first outing, but it certainly isn’t spicier."

Roshni Devi of Koimoi gave the movie 2/5 stars, stating that "It’s only the actors and the music of Gangs of Wasseypur 2 that would make it worth the watch."

Martin D'Souza of Glamsham gave the movie 1.5/5 stars, concluding that "In short, Part 2 'Definitely' does not have a 'Perpendicular' rise. It is off 'Tangent'!"

Gaurav Mokhasi of SecondBaseCritics heaped praise on Part 2 saying, "One needs to realise that GoW was never meant to be the expeditious Lamborghini that speeds past you in an instant and leaves you gasping. Rather, it is the Rolls Royce that cruises slowly by your side, instilling in you a prolonged feeling of awe. The movie deliberately slows down on more than one occasion as the director indulges in it and draws you into his larger than life vision."

International
International critics have given Gangs of Wasseypur, the first mainstream Bollywood film to be selected for the Director's Fortnight, rave reviews following its world premiere at the 65th Cannes Film Festival. Gangs of Wasseypur premiered at the 65th Cannes Film Festival on the evening of 22 May 2012 as the most highly anticipated Indian film. Deborah Young of The Hollywood Reporter called the film "an extraordinary ride through Bollywood's spectacular, over-the-top filmmaking".

Kashyap, whose reputation as a screenwriter and controversial director reach a culmination in this film, is the real behind-the-scenes godfather, never losing control over the story-telling or hundreds of actors, and allowing tongue-in-cheek diversions in the second half that confirm his command over the sprawling material. In the spirit of Bollywood, Rajiv Ravi's lensing is fast on its feet, with a continually moving camera that always seems to be in the right spot to capture the action. Referring to the violence and pace of the film she says "Gangs of Wasseypur puts Tarantino in a corner with its cool command of cinematically-inspired and referenced violence, ironic characters and breathless pace".

Maggie Lee of Variety notes Kashyap never lets his diverse influences of old-school Italo-American mafia classics a la Coppola, Scorsese and Leone, as well as David Michod's taut crime thriller "Animal Kingdom," override the distinct Indian color. Calling the film "the love child of Bollywood and Hollywood," she felt the film was "by turns pulverizing and poetic in its depiction of violence."

Lee Marshall of Screen International writes "the script alternates engagingly between scenes of sometimes stomach-churning violence and moments of domestic comedy, made more tasty by hard-boiled lines of dialogue like "in Wasseypur even the pigeons fly with one wing, because they need the other to cover their arse" ". He describes song lyrics "as if mouthed by a Greek chorus of street punks" commenting sarcastically on what's happening onscreen.

Gangs of Wasseypur holds a current rating of 89 on the popular critic website Metacritic, thereby receiving a "Universal Acclaim" status from it.

Box officeGangs of Wasseypur – Part 2 opened to a poor to medium response at most places in the country. The opening was around the 30% mark on average. The business of two days including paid previews is  nett. The film has collected around  nett in nine days plus paid previews. The first part of Gangs of Wasseypur was not a huge hit and this has led to the second part doing lesser business. Its net collection stands at 
Even on its own, the net domestic collections of  far exceeds the individual budget of Part 2'' i.e. , making it a successful commercial venture.

Differences from actual events
The film mainly draws its story from the real life gang wars that took place in the Dhanbad area. There are several events in the film which differ from the actual documented events. The character of Faizal Khan, played by Nawazuddin Siddiqui, dies in the climax. The character is based on Fahim Khan, who was not killed but is currently in jail in Hazaribagh and has been sentenced to life imprisonment. In the film, Sardar Khan marries a Bengali Hindu woman but in real life, the woman was maintained as a mistress. Most of the gang wars were between the gangs of Wasseypur and not with the Singh family led by Ramadhir Singh (played by Tigmanshu Dhulia) as depicted. The Singhs had been instrumental in instigating the gang wars, but never participated in them.

Another scene in the movie depicts a Muslim girl being kidnapped by Singh's men. In reality, the victim was a local Hindu girl and the kidnappers were a few goons from Wasseypur. Members of the Singh family threatened all Wasseypur residents with retaliation if the girl was not returned within 24 hours. The girl was eventually returned as the Singhs were regarded with fear in Wasseypur.

The character of Ramadhir Singh is based on Surajdeo Singh. In the film's climax, Singh is brutally killed by Faizal Khan but in real life, Surajdeo Singh was poisoned in his native village during an election campaign in June 1991. Allegedly, Suresh Singh had him poisoned both to avenge the murder of BP Sinha and so that Suresh could become the undisputed coal king of Dhanbad.

The character of Faizal Khan's friend Fazlu is based on Sabir Alam. In the film, Fazlu is killed and decapitated by Faizal Khan. In real life, Sabir Alam and Fahim Khan were childhood friends turned enemies. Sabir was awarded the life sentence in 2007 for the murder of Fahim Khan's mother and aunt, and is currently out on bail in Wasseypur.

The mafia's downfall in Dhanbad didn't come from gang wars but rather it came from the differences between Kunti Singh, the widow of Surajdeo Singh, and his three brothers – Baccha Singh, Rajan Singh and Ram Dhani Singh – which gave others an opportunity to make space for themselves.

References

External links
 
 

2010s Hindi-language films
Films set in the 1990s
Films set in the 2000s
Films set in the 1940s
Indian crime action films
Indian crime drama films
2012 films
2012 crime action films
2012 crime drama films
2012 crime thriller films
Indian crime thriller films
Indian gangster films
Indian epic films
Indian films about revenge
Films set in Bihar
Films set in Jharkhand
Films set in Mumbai
Films about organised crime in India
Films about corruption in India
Films shot in Bihar
Films scored by Sneha Khanwalkar
Films that won the Best Audiography National Film Award
Viacom18 Studios films
Films with screenplays by Anurag Kashyap
Indian sequel films
Films set in Dhanbad
Indian black comedy films